THE DARK DAYS is an American docudrama directed and written by David A. Malone. The film stars James Mullaney, Malissa Williams, Cobie Moses, Jordan A. Baner and Cory Novak.

Shooting took place in the Metro East and St. Louis, Missouri.

Plot 
RJ Saager (James Mullaney) comes from a broken family and is lost in the world, with soccer being his only way out. RJ starts going down a dark road of drugs and alcohol; the only person who can save him is himself.

Cast 
 James Mullaney as RJ Saager
 Malissa Williams as Molly Howells
 Cobie Moses as Matthew Wentworth
 Jordan A. Baner as Daniel Hartman-Fulton
 Cory Novak as Jacob Saylor

Production 
Filming began in summer 2014, and lasted until summer 2015, with production talking place in St. Louis, Missouri and some scenes taking place in East St. Louis, Illinois.

References

External links 
 
 

2016 films
Drama films based on actual events
Films about drugs
Films shot in Illinois
Films shot in Missouri
Films set in St. Louis
American drama films
2016 drama films
2010s English-language films
2010s American films